The Wacky World of Mother Goose is a 1967 animated musical fantasy film made by Rankin/Bass, written by Romeo Muller and directed by Jules Bass based on Charles Perrault's stories and nursery rhymes. The movie is the first theatrical feature by Rankin and Bass. It features Humpty Dumpty, the Old Woman Who Lives in a Shoe, and the Crooked Man (the villain). Mother Goose is voiced by Margaret Rutherford in her final film role.

Plot

In the land of Old King Cole: Jack and Jill, Simple Simon, Georgie Porgie, Humpty Dumpty, and the others are worried when Mother Goose has to visit her sister who lives beyond the Moon. Meanwhile, Count Warptwist the Crooked Man is up to no good and will stop at nothing to rule the land, so it's up to the good characters to try and stop him.

Cast
Margaret Rutherford - Mother Goose
Bob McFadden - Humpty Dumpty
Bradley Bolke - Crooked Man
Laura Leslie - Princess Harmony
James Daugherty
Craig Sechler
Susan Melvin - Mary, Mary, Quite Contrary
Kevin Gavin
Bryna Raeburn - Old Mother Hubbard / Mother Goose's Sister
Robert Harter
William Marine

Crew
 Director - Jules Bass
 Producer - Arthur Rankin Jr.
 Executive Producer - Joseph E. Levine
 Associate Producer - Larry Roemer
 Screenplay - Romeo Muller
 Story - Arthur Rankin Jr.
 Adaptation from The Tales of Mother Goose - Charles Perrault
 Music and Lyrics - George Wilkins, Jules Bass
 Character Designer - Paul Coker Jr. (uncredited)
 Continuity Designer - Don Duga
 Animation Production - Toei Animation (uncredited)
 Assistant Director - Kizo Nagashima
 Sound Engineers: Stephen Frohock, Alan Mirchin, Peter Page, Eric Tomlinson

See also
List of American films of 1967

References

External links

The Wacky World of Mother Goose at the TCM Movie Database

1967 films
1967 animated films
1960s American animated films
American children's animated adventure films
American children's animated fantasy films
American fantasy adventure films
Films based on nursery rhymes
Films directed by Jules Bass
Rankin/Bass Productions films
Toei Animation films
Embassy Pictures films
1960s fantasy adventure films
Films with screenplays by Arthur Rankin Jr.
Films with screenplays by Romeo Muller
1960s children's animated films
1960s English-language films